Véu de Noiva is a Brazilian telenovela produced and broadcast by TV Globo. It premiered on 10 November 1969 and ended on 6 June 1970, with a total of 221 episodes in black and white. It's the eight "novela das oito" to be aired on the timeslot. It was created and written by Janete Clair, and directed by Daniel Filho.

Cast 
 Regina Duarte - Andréa / Roberta / Maria Célia
 Cláudio Marzo - Marcelo Montserrat
 Myriam Pérsia - Flor
 Geraldo Del Rey - Luciano
 Betty Faria - Irene
 Cláudio Cavalcanti - Renato Madeira
 Márcia Rodrigues - Tatiane
 José Augusto Branco - Sérgio
 Ênio Santos - Eugênio
 Glauce Rocha - Helena
 Paulo José - Zé Mário
 Carlos Eduardo Dolabella - Armando
 Djenane Machado - Maria Eduarda
 Gilberto Martinho - Felício
 Ana Ariel - Rosa
 Neuza Amaral - Lurdes
 Álvaro Aguiar - Dr. Albertini
 Oswaldo Loureiro - Chico
 Suzana Faini - Dulce
 Emiliano Queiroz - Tomaz
 Suzana de Moraes - Suzana
 Darlene Glória - Leda
 Miriam Pires - Mariana
 Zilka Salaberry - Tia Cora
 Lourdinha Bittencourt - Olga
 Mary Daniel - Mariana
 Paulo Gonçalves - Seu Lorena
 Jorge Cherques - Wilson
 Júlio César - Antônio Lopes

References

External links 
 

TV Globo telenovelas
1969 telenovelas
Brazilian telenovelas
1969 Brazilian television series debuts
1970 Brazilian television series endings
Portuguese-language telenovelas